Results for the Quarterfinals  of the 2012–13 Euroleague basketball tournament.

The quarterfinals were played from 9 to 26 of April, 2013. Team #1 (i.e., the group winner in each series) hosted Games 1 and 2, plus Game 5 if necessary. Team #2 hosted Game 3, plus Game 4 if necessary.

All times given below are in Central European Time.

Quarterfinals

* if necessary

Game 1

Game 2

Game 3

Game 4

Game 5

External links
Euroleague schedule

Quarterfinals